Karl Politz (14 August 1903 – 5 September 1987) was a German international footballer.

References

1903 births
1987 deaths
Association football forwards
German footballers
Germany international footballers
Hamburger SV players